The  projects south from the Japanese island of Kyūshū and includes the southernmost point on the island, Cape Sata. Its east coast lies on the Pacific Ocean, while to the west it faces the Satsuma Peninsula across Kagoshima Bay. Politically it is part of Kagoshima Prefecture. Lava erupted in 1914 by Sakurajima (previously an island) made a land connection with the northwest of the Ōsumi Peninsula.

See also
: Southernmost point

References 

Peninsulas of Japan
Landforms of Kagoshima Prefecture